Coppermine Herald of Arms is the title of one of the officers of arms at the Canadian Heraldic Authority in Ottawa. The office was created in 2003 and Coppermine Herald is the assistant artist of the Authority. Like the other heralds at the Authority, the name is derived from the Canadian river. The design of the badge of office of Coppermine Herald of Arms was assigned on 15 June 2005. The ulu in the badge is a traditional Inuit knife that has existed for over 4000 years. It honours the northern people and land. Its copper colour refers to the title Coppermine Herald. Since the creation of the office, it has been held by Catherine Fitzpatrick.

See also
Heraldry
Herald
Royal Heraldry Society of Canada

External links
 Canadian Heraldic Authority
 Canadian Herladic Authority's Public Register of Arms, Flags and Badges – Badge of office

Offices of arms
Canadian Heraldic Authority